Bell Bank Park is a multi-purpose complex in Mesa, Arizona, United States.  It opened on January 7, 2022, before a Grand Opening took place on 4 February 2022, headlined by musician Lindsey Stirling.

History
Bell Bank Park is situated on the site of a former General Motors testing facility.   In 2018, Mesa voters voted against a bond request for a state owned sports facility nearby and that paved the way for this facility to begin.

Ground was broken on the project in October, 2020. The facility is a vision of Legacy Sports, and was known as Legacy Sports Park before a 10-year naming rights deal was struck agreed to with Bell Bank. The facility was estimated to have cost $280million.

Prior to completion, events were booked including the Jam On It amateur basketball tournaments, who committed to hosting events at the facility until 2032.

Bell Bank Park opened with an event hosted by the Association of Pickleball Professionals Tour on 4 January 2022.

In February 2022, it was announced that the Gilbert, Ariz., campus of Park University would make Bell Bank Park the home for their athletic events.

From 2022, the stadium is the home of Valley United FC and FC Arizona.

Facilities
The facility spans across  and includes:

 5,000 seat outdoor stadium
 2,800 seat indoor stadium
 35 soccer/lacrosse fields
 57 indoor volleyball courts
 8 baseball/softball fields
 20 basketball courts
 41 pickleball courts
 12 beach volleyball courts
 22 futsal courts
 Gymnastics center
 Dance studio
 Cheer center
 Sports performance center

Commercial partnerships
The facility has a number of commercial partnerships facilitated through Oak View Group and Legacy Sports.  These include:

Bell Bank 
Phoenix Children's 
Valley Toyota

Venue Names

References

Sports venues in Arizona
Music venues in Arizona
Sports in Mesa, Arizona
2022 establishments in Arizona
Sports venues completed in 2022
Soccer venues in Arizona
National Independent Soccer Association stadiums
National Premier Soccer League stadiums
Park University
Basketball venues in Arizona
College basketball venues in the United States
College soccer venues in the United States
College volleyball venues in the United States
College beach volleyball venues in the United States
College softball venues in the United States